The 1981 anti-Tamil pogrom occurred in Sri Lanka during the months of June, July and August 1981. Organised Sinhala mobs looted and burnt Tamil shops and houses in Jaffna, Ratnapura, Balangoda, Kahawatte, Colombo and in the border villages in the Batticaloa and Amparai districts. Further looting, arson and killings then spread to the rural interior:
 

Brian Eads in the London Observer of 20 September 1981 reported that an orgy of arson and looting was planned, orchestrated and carried out in Jaffna by the predominantly Sinhalese Buddhist police force in the area.

During the violence the Jaffna public library was burned, as well as the offices of a Tamil newspaper, and the home of a Tamil MP. The violence was said to have been organized by members of the ruling United National Party. In all, 25 people died, scores of women were raped, and thousands were made homeless, losing all their meager belongings.

See also
 List of anti-minority pogroms in Sri Lanka
 Sri Lankan Civil War

References

1981 riots
1981 in Sri Lanka
Massacres in Sri Lanka
Ethnic riots
Riots and civil disorder in Sri Lanka
Indian Tamils of Sri Lanka